Sari Sarkomaa (born 24 September 1965 in Tampere, Finland) is a Finnish politician and former Minister of Education. She served in Matti Vanhanen's second cabinet between 19 April 2007 and 19 December 2008. Sarkomaa quit her ministerial post to spend more time with her family. She was succeeded by Henna Virkkunen.

References

External links
  Sari Sarkomaa's website

1965 births
Living people
Politicians from Tampere
National Coalition Party politicians
Ministers of Education of Finland
Members of the Parliament of Finland (1999–2003)
Members of the Parliament of Finland (2003–07)
Members of the Parliament of Finland (2007–11)
Members of the Parliament of Finland (2011–15)
Members of the Parliament of Finland (2015–19)
Members of the Parliament of Finland (2019–23)
Women government ministers of Finland
21st-century Finnish women politicians
Women members of the Parliament of Finland
University of Helsinki alumni